Chokkanathapuram is a village with 30 houses in Palakkad district in the state of Kerala in India. They operate in IST (UTC+5:30) time. The elevation is 95 m above sea level.

References

Villages in Palakkad district